Broadwater is an electoral division of West Sussex in the United Kingdom, and returns one member to sit on West Sussex County Council.

Extent
The division covers the original settlement of Worthing of Broadwater village and came into existence as the result of a boundary review recommended by the Boundary Committee for England, the results of which were accepted by the Electoral Commission in March 2009.

It falls entirely within the un-parished area of Worthing Borough and comprises the following borough wards: all but WA3 polling district of Broadwater Ward and the eastern part of Gaisford Ward.

Election results

2013 Election
Results of the election held on 2 May 2013:

2009 Election
Results of the election held on 4 June 2009:

References
Election Results - West Sussex County Council

External links
 West Sussex County Council
 Election Maps

Electoral Divisions of West Sussex
Worthing